Colquhounia coccinea is a species of flowering plant in the mint family Lamiaceae. It is commonly known as scarlet-flowered colquhounia or Himalayan mint shrub. It is native to China, Bhutan, Nepal, Myanmar, India and Thailand. Spikes of red or deep orange flowers, with yellow interiors, appear in late summer. Its native habitats include slopes, stony grassy hillsides, thickets, and river valleys. 

It is not entirely hardy (RHS H4), and requires a sheltered position in full sun, with protection from winter wet.

The Latin specific epithet coccinea refers to the red colour of the flowers.

References

Flora of Bhutan
Flora of China
Flora of India (region)
Flora of Myanmar
Flora of Nepal
Flora of Thailand
Lamiaceae